Pusta Ves is a village at municipality Prašník in Piešťany District in the Trnava Region of western Slovakia.

""Pusta Ves"" is a village in the western part of Slovakia. 
Pusta Ves is a hub of marked hiking trails through the surrounding forests.

Pusta Ves is located in 250 meters at the foot of the  Small Carpathian's 18 km west of the spa town of  Piestany. Pusta Ves means village in the remote. The small community is surrounded by high hills and vast forests. The village is divided into an upper and lower part classified respectively: Horna Pusta Ves and Dolná Pusta Ves.

While Slovakia was independent from 1939 to 1945 people with Czech or Jewish background found refuge in and around the village.

Since Slovakia August 29. 1944 was at war with Germany was the remote village immediately was a gathering and command center for  partisans who fought against German soldiers. The village men were imprisoned in  Trenčín  and two houses were burned by  fascists. The village women organized catering, maintenance of uniforms and transporting weapons for partisans. The partisans later received support of the Red Army partisans. The village did not experience massacre and most prisoners could return home after the end of war in 1945. In 1968, the village had Red Star hero status. At the burial site with partisans grave in front of the village is a small museum and an  amphitheater where there are antifascist manifestation, display of partisans fight and market on every year on August 29.

Villages and municipalities in Piešťany District